Roland Leitinger (born 13 May 1991) is an Austrian World Cup alpine ski racer. He competes primarily in giant slalom, occasionally in slalom, and made his World Cup debut in February 2011.

World Cup results

Season standings

Race podiums

 2 podiums – (1 GS, 1 PG)

World Championship results

References

External links

1991 births
Living people
Austrian male alpine skiers